On a Wing and a Prayer is an upcoming American drama film directed by Sean McNamara and starring Dennis Quaid, Heather Graham, and Jesse Metcalfe.

Plot
A father, with his wife and daughters, board a private plane. While in the air, the pilot dies suddenly. The father must now land the plane to save his family.

Cast
Dennis Quaid as Doug White
Heather Graham as Terri White
Jesse Metcalfe as Cory
Jessi Case as Maggie
Rocky Myers as Dan

Release
The film was originally going to be released theatrically on August 31, 2022 by United Artists Releasing, until it moved to April 7, 2023 as a Prime Video exclusive, after Amazon shut down the distributor and folded its operations into MGM.

References

External links
 
 

Metro-Goldwyn-Mayer films
Films directed by Sean McNamara